Scott Buete (born July 23, 1980 in Bowie, Maryland) is a retired American soccer player and soccer coach who last played for the Baltimore Blast. He is currently the assistant coach of the Maryland Terrapins men's soccer program.

Career

College
Buete played five years for the University of Maryland from 1999 to 2003, starting in 89 games.  He finished his career scoring 11 goals, and assisting on 24 more.  Buete was named a first team NSCAA All-American his senior year.

Professional
After graduating from Maryland, Buete was drafted 9th overall by the Chicago Fire in the 2004 MLS SuperDraft.  Buete played a supporting role his first year, playing 702 minutes over 13 games, while filling in when needed for Chris Armas and Jesse Marsch.  After seeing even less time in 2005 due to a bad midseason injury, he was released during the 2006 preseason.

He then signed with the Atlanta Silverbacks of the USL First Division. The Baltimore Blast selected Buete in the fourth round of the 2006 Major Indoor Soccer League (MISL) Dispersal Draft.  He played his first game with the Blast on October 9, 2007, winning the 2007–2008 MISL championship with the Blast.  This led to Buete joining the Silverbacks after the 2008 season began as the MISL championship series ran into the USL season.  MISL collapsed after the 2007–2008 season and the Blast moved to the newly created National Indoor Soccer League. Buete returned to the Blast for the 2008–2009 NISL season as well as the 2009–10 and 2010-11 MISL seasons, as the team NISL obtained rights to the Major League Indoor Soccer moniker.

In January 2009, the Atlanta Silverbacks announced they had withdrawn from USL-1 for the 2009 season and Buete signed with the Charleston Battery on April 3, 2009.

Buete signed with new USSF Division 2 franchise FC Tampa Bay in January 2010. He was released by the club on February 22, 2011.

Coaching career 
In May 2014, Buete joined Sasho Cirovski's coaching staff at the University of Maryland. He has been an assistant coach with the program since then.

References

External links
 Charleston Battery bio
 Baltimore Blast bio

1980 births
Living people
American soccer players
American soccer coaches
Association football midfielders
Atlanta Silverbacks players
Baltimore Blast (2001–2008 MISL) players
Baltimore Blast (2008–2014 MISL) players
Charleston Battery players
Chicago Fire FC players
Tampa Bay Rowdies players
Major Indoor Soccer League (2001–2008) players
Major League Soccer players
Major Indoor Soccer League (2008–2014) players
Maryland Terrapins men's soccer players
Maryland Terrapins men's soccer coaches
People from Bowie, Maryland
Soccer players from Maryland
USL First Division players
USSF Division 2 Professional League players
Chicago Fire FC draft picks
All-American men's college soccer players